Zardeyn Rural District is in Nir District of Taft County, Yazd province, Iran. At the National Census of 2006, its population was 2,516 in 805 households. There were 1,911 inhabitants in 705 households at the following census of 2011. At the most recent census of 2016, the population of the rural district was 1,965 in 788 households. The largest of its 55 villages was Zardeyn, with 556 people.

Flood of 2022

The flood of 22 July 2022 caused a lot of damage to this rural district, including the destruction of more than 50 houses and 15 cars, as well as damage to aqueducts, agricultural plots and roads in the area.

References 

Taft County

Rural Districts of Yazd Province

Populated places in Yazd Province

Populated places in Taft County